Ralph Rainger ( Reichenthal; October 7, 1901 – October 23, 1942) was an American composer of popular music principally for films.

Biography
Born Ralph Reichenthal in New York City, United States, Rainger initially embarked on a legal career, having obtained his law degree at Brown University in 1926. He had, however, studied piano from a young age and attended the Institute of Musical Art in New York. Public performances include radio broadcasts from New York and WOR (New Jersey) as early as 1922. These were as soloist, accompanist to singers, and as duo-pianist with Adam Carroll or "Edgar Fairchild" (the name Milton Suskind used for commercial work).
 
He also prepared piano rolls between 1922 and 1928 for Ampico, Standard, and DeLuxe. Some of these used the "Reichenthal" surname, others the "Rainger" name he was gradually adopting commercially.

Other early musical activities include arranging for bandleader Ray Miller. His own band leading included a 1923 engagement—Ralph Reichenthal Orchestra—at the Asbury Park (NJ) Claredon-Brunswick Hotel.

Rainger's first credit on Broadway, 1926's "Queen High", was as duo-pianist in the pit with Fairchild, following the show's break-in in Philadelphia. He later played for 1928's "Angela" and "Cross my Heart".

His first hit "Moanin' Low," with lyrics by Howard Dietz, was written for Clifton Webb's co-star Libby Holman in the 1929 revue The Little Show. Webb, tracing the song's origin, noted that Rainger was Webb's accompanist in vaudeville when Webb was invited to appear in the new show, and that Webb had asked Rainger for a contribution.

With the advent of motion picture sound and the film musical, Rainger and other songwriters found work in Hollywood. He teamed up with lyricist Leo Robin to produce a string of successful film songs, including "I'll Take An Option On You", from the Broadway hit show Tattle Tales (1933).

In the years that followed, Rainger wrote or collaborated on such hit songs as "I Wished on the Moon", "Love in Bloom" (comedian Jack Benny's theme song), "Faithful Forever", "Easy Living", "June in January", "Blue Hawaii", and with Leo Robin on the 1938 Oscar-winning song "Thanks for the Memory", sung by Bob Hope in the film The Big Broadcast of 1938.

Songwriting for Hollywood's mass audience had its challenges, as lyricist Leo Robin noted:
On the stage after all, you can aim at a particular audience. You can please just New York, or just a small portion of New York. In pictures you have to please the whole country, and most of the world besides. The songs must have universal appeal, get down to something that every human being feels and can understand. That isn’t so hard really, once you get the trick of simplicity.

Rainger paid one year's tuition fees to the Austrian composer Arnold Schoenberg in advance, so that Schoenberg could pay for the transportation of his belongings to Los Angeles from Paris in 1933.

Rainger died in a plane crash near Palm Springs, California, in 1942. He was a passenger aboard American Airlines Flight 28, a DC-3 airliner that was involved in a mid-air collision with a U.S. Army Air Corps bomber.  Rainger, then age 41, was survived by his wife, Elizabeth ("Betty"), an eight-year-old son, and two daughters, aged five and one. In the initial 1942 press coverage of the crash, the collision was not acknowledged; Betty Rainger later sued American Airlines and won a substantial judgement late in 1943.

Film credits
Film credits include:
1930 - Tom Sawyer
1930 - The Virtuous Sin
1932 - The Big Broadcast
1932 - A Farewell to Arms
1932 - This Is the Night
1933 - A Bedtime Story
1933 - From Hell to Heaven
1933 - She Done Him Wrong
1933 - International House
1933 - Three-Cornered Moon
1934 - Kiss and Make-Up
1934 - Come on Marines
1934 - Bolero
1934 - All of Me
1934 - Little Miss Marker
1934 - Search for Beauty
1934 - Six of a Kind
1935 - The Devil Is a Woman
1935 - The Big Broadcast of 1936
1935 - Ruggles of Red Gap
1936 - The Big Broadcast of 1937
1936 - Rhythm on the Range
1936 - Rose of the Rancho
1936 - Poppy
1936 - Palm Springs
1936 - Three Cheers for Love
1937 - King of Gamblers
1937 - The Big Broadcast of 1938, including the Academy Award-winning song "Thanks for the Memory"
1937 - Blossoms on Broadway
1937 - Hills of Old Wyoming
1937 - Ebb Tide
1937 - Swing High, Swing Low
1937 - Waikiki Wedding
1937 - Souls at Sea
1938 - Her Jungle Love
1938 - Artists and Models Abroad
1938 - Romance in the Dark
1938 - The Texans
1939 - Gulliver's Travels, including the Academy Award nominated song "Faithful Forever"
1939 - $1000 a Touchdown
1941 - Cadet Girl
1941 - A Yank in the R.A.F.
1941 - Tall, Dark and Handsome
1941 - Rise and Shine
1941 - New York Town
1942 - Footlight Serenade
1942 - True to the Army
1942 - My Gal Sal

See also
 :Category:Songs with music by Ralph Rainger

References

External links
 
 
 
 
 
 Ralph Rainger recordings at the Discography of American Historical Recordings.

1901 births
1942 deaths
Accidental deaths in California
American male composers
Songwriters from New York (state)
Best Original Song Academy Award-winning songwriters
Musicians from New York City
Victims of aviation accidents or incidents in 1942
Victims of aviation accidents or incidents in the United States
Burials at Forest Lawn Memorial Park (Glendale)
20th-century American composers
20th-century American male musicians
American male songwriters